Steven K. Tsuchida is an American film and television director. He has directed episodes of The Sarah Silverman Program, Younger, Community, Dear White People, and the award-winning short film A Ninja Pays Half My Rent. A Ninja Pays Half My Rent was featured on the premiere of the Comedy Central program Atom TV.

In 2018, he directed Freeform's Life-Size 2 starring Tyra Banks and Francia Raisa, and the 2021 romantic film Resort to Love.  In 2023, he directed the Netflix original film, A Tourist's Guide to Love.

References

External links

American film directors
American television directors
Living people
Place of birth missing (living people)
Year of birth missing (living people)